Koitelinkoski (i.e. Koiteli rapids) is an outdoor recreation area located along the Kiiminkijoki river in the Kiiminki district in Oulu, Finland. The area consists of small islands which divide the free-flowing river into smaller streams and rapids. The Koitelinkoski rapids stretch about three kilometers on the river. The rapids are one of the most impressive ones on the Kiiminkijoki river.

The larger islands are connected with suspension bridges. There is a summer café and an event stage on the largest, Sahasaari, island. There are several campfire sites scattered on the islands.

References

Gallery

External links 

Geography of Oulu
Kiiminki (district)
Rapids
Tourist attractions in Oulu